Fillmore County can refer to two real, and one fictional county in the US

Fillmore County, Minnesota
Fillmore County, Nebraska
The fictional Fillmore County, Kansas